Trepov is a Russian surname. Notable people with the name include:

 Alexander Trepov (1862–1928), Prime Minister of the Russian Empire
 Dmitri Feodorovich Trepov (1850–1906), Head of Moscow police and Governor-General of St. Petersburg
 Fyodor Trepov (disambiguation), multiple people, including:
Fyodor Trepov (senior) (1809–1889), Russian government official
Fyodor Trepov (junior) (1854–1938), Russian military and government official

Russian-language surnames